George Archer (1939–2005) was an American golfer.

George Archer may also refer to:

George Archer (architect) (1848–1920), American architect
George A. Archer (1850–1932), American businessman
George E. Archer (1853–1903), chief architect of the Erie Railroad
George Archer (politician) (1881–1956), Australian politician

See also
George Archer-Shee (1895–1914), Royal Navy cadet